A pentagram is the shape of a five-pointed star drawn with five straight strokes.

Pentagram may also refer to:

 Pentagram (design studio), a graphic design studio
 PENTAGRAM, a Japanese professional esports team
 Pentagram (video game), a 1986 video game in the Sabre Man series
 Pentagramm, the German title of The First Power (1990), an American horror movie
 Pentagram, a children's novel series by Anthony Horowitz
 The pentagram map, a geometrical construction defined for polygons
 "Pentagram" (Raised by Wolves), a 2020 television episode

Music bands 
 Mezarkabul, a Turkish metal band also known as Pentagram
 Pentagram (Indian band), an Indian rock band started in 1993
 Pentagram (band), an American doom metal band
 Pentagram Chile, a thrash/death metal band started in 1985

Music works 
 Relentless (Pentagram album), an album initially released under the name Pentagram by the American band
 Pentagram (Pentagram album), an album by the Chilean band
 Pentagram (Mezarkabul album), released in 1990 by Mezarkabul
 Pentagram (Gorgoroth album), released in 1994
 "Pentagram," a song by Prefuse 73 from the 2003 album One Word Extinguisher
 "Pentagram," a song by Cake from the 1994 album Motorcade of Generosity

See also 
 Five-pointed star, the shape of the outline of a pentagram, often used on political flags
 Pentacle, an amulet sometimes called a "pentangle" (a synonym for "pentagram", although "pentacle" is not)
 Pentagrammaton (disambiguation)